Aarberg Castle is a castle in the municipality of Aarberg in the canton of Bern in Switzerland.

History
While the builder of the castle is unknown, the city itself was founded between 1220 and 1225 by count Ulrich III of Neuchâtel.  The count had recently acquired the rulership over this region and needed a central location from which to rule.  The island and the key bridge was a natural location for a town.  The castle may have been built around the time of the founding of the city.  

The city was besieged in 1339, 1382 and 1386 but not taken.  In 1358 the Graf (or Count) Peter von Aarberg was in financial difficulties and began looking for someone to buy the city.  After years of unsuccessful attempts, in 1377-79 he was able to sell the city and his rights as ruler to Bern.  The Bernese bailiff took up residence in Aarberg Castle in 1379.  In 1380, the old castle roof was replaced with a new shingle roof.  In 1419 and again in 1477, the town and castle of Aarberg were nearly destroyed in a fire.  Both the town and castle were rebuilt following the destructive fires.

See also
 List of castles in Switzerland

References

External links
 
 Burgenseite article on Aarberg Casle (in German)
 Swisscastles article on Aarberg Casle (in German)

Castles in the Canton of Bern